Hao Chunrong (born April 1963) is a former Chinese politician who spent her entire career in northeast China's Liaoning province. She was investigated by China's top anti-corruption (referred to as anti-graft in English language Chinese sources) agency in March 2022. Previously she served as vice governor of Liaoning. She is a delegate to the 13th National People's Congress.

Early life and education
Hao was born in Yantai, Shandong, in April 1963. In 1980, she entered Liaoyang Health School, and worked there after graduation.

Career
Hao joined the Chinese Communist Party (CCP) in January 1985. In September 1985, she became deputy secretary of Liaoyang Health Bureau Committee of the Communist Youth League of China, rising to secretary in April 1989. She served as deputy secretary of Liaoyang Committee of the Communist Youth League of China in February 1990, and nine months later promoted to the secretary position. In February 1996, she became vice governor of Taizihe District, rising to become governor in December 1999. In November 2000, she was admitted to member of the standing committee of the CCP Liaoyang Municipal Committee, the city's top authority. She concurrently served as vice mayor since January 2003. He was deputy party secretary of Chaoyang in April 2012, and held that office until March 2014, when she was appointed director of Liaoning Provincial Tourism Administration. In September 2016, she was promoted to acting mayor of Panjin, confirmed in October. In January 2018, she was elevated to vice governor of Liaoning, a position at vice-ministerial level.

Corruption allegations
On 30 March 2022, she was put under investigation for alleged "serious violations of discipline and laws" by the Central Commission for Discipline Inspection (CCDI), the party's internal disciplinary body, and the National Supervisory Commission, the highest anti-corruption agency of China. She was expelled from the party for corruption and bribery. She has been referred to the Procuratorate for criminal investigation and prosecution. Her colleague Wang Dawei was sacked for corruption on March 1. On September 1, she was expelled from the CCP and removed from public office. The Taipei Times reported Han's expulsion as an example of factionalism within the CCP.

References

1963 births
Living people
People from Yantai
Central Party School of the Chinese Communist Party alumni
People's Republic of China politicians from Shandong
Chinese Communist Party politicians from Shandong
Delegates to the 13th National People's Congress